Ancs is a hamlet located in the municipality of Baix Pallars, in Province of Lleida province, Catalonia, Spain. As of 2020, it has a population of 4.

Geography 
Ancs is located 132km north-northeast of Lleida.

References

Populated places in the Province of Lleida